rs6295, also called C(-1019)G, is a gene variation—a single nucleotide polymorphism (SNP)—in the HTR1A gene. It is one of the most investigated SNPs of its gene. The C-allele is the most prevalent with 0.675 against the G-allele with 0.325 among Caucasian.

The effect of the SNP on the binding potential of the human 5-HT1A neuroreceptor has been assessed with positron emission tomography and the WAY-100635 radioligand, with a study reporting no apparent influence from the SNP.

Disorders
The SNP has been investigated for association with suicide attempts, and psychiatric disorders. One study found an association of the variant with schizophrenia. Some studies associate the G-allele or GG-genotype with depression. Not all studies show associations between the disorder and the G-allele. In one study of premenstrual dysphoric disorder C/C was found as the high-risk genotype.

Several studies have examine the SNP association with medical treatment response, e.g., antidepressant response in mood disorders, e.g., one study reported worse response for G-allele patients.

Personality
The polymorphism has also been investigated for links to personality traits. Persons with the G-allele of the polymorphism may have higher personality score for the NEO PI-R Neuroticism and TPQ Harm Avoidance traits. However, not all studies can find a clear association. One study has studied another trait and found higher score on Temperament and Character Inventory self-transcendence scale for G-allele subjects among mood disorder patients.

Other SNPs
There are a number of other SNPs for the HTR1A gene: C549T, Ile28Val (rs1799921), Pro16Leu (rs1800041), Gly272Asp (rs1800042) and G294A (rs6294).

References

SNPs on chromosome 5